Otur, Outur in Asturian and officially, is a parish located in Valdés, a municipality within the province and Autonomous Community of Asturias, in northern Spain.

Transport
Otur is located in the N-634 road. The parish has a FEVE station at the Ferrol–Gijón line.

Town list 
 Boronas
 Canéu
 Las Prales
 Las Torres
 Los Umeiros
 La Barraca
 Sabugu
 Otur
 Las Cabornas
 La Fervencia
 La Calea
 Carral
 La Casona
 La Cruz
 La Ḷḷañada
 Palaciu
 La Pedrera
 El Pinieḷḷu
 Las Pontigas
 El Reḷḷón
 Riucanéu
 Riumayor
 Los Romedios
 L'Ayalga
 Viḷḷar
 Las Casas de la Playa

References 

Parishes in Valdés